RanXerox is an Italian science fiction graphic novel series by Stefano Tamburini and Tanino Liberatore, two Italian artists who had worked on such magazines as Cannibale and Frigidaire. Conceived as a bizarre antihero, RanXerox was a mechanical creature made from Xerox photocopier parts.

At first (1978, in Italian, in Cannibale) the name was "Rank Xerox", identical to that of a joint venture between the Xerox Corporation of the U.S. and the Rank Organisation of the U.K., the latter of which manufactures and markets Xerox equipment in Europe. Due to a threatened lawsuit by Rank Xerox for using their trademarked name, Tamburini changed it to "RanXerox" (1980, also in Italian, in Frigidaire). The name "Ranx" has also been used in some cases. The first time RanXerox was published in English was in the July 1983 issue of Heavy Metal. Many more issues of Heavy Metal, as well as novels followed, featuring RanXerox (such as "RanXerox in America"). The artist uses Pantone pens to create his unique style of art.

Richard Corben said about the character:

Tanino Liberatore also created the artwork for the Frank Zappa album The Man from Utopia; the image of Zappa on the cover bears a strong resemblance to RanXerox.

Ranx: The Video Game was developed by Ubisoft in 1990 for DOS, Amiga, and Atari ST.

References

External links
 Comic Vine
 Urban Aspirines

Italian comics titles
1978 comics debuts
Science fiction comics
Cyberpunk comics
Science fiction graphic novels
Fictional robots
Erotic comics
Heavy Metal (magazine) titles
Italian comics characters
Comics characters introduced in 1978
Comics adapted into video games